Foodsi is a Polish mobile application that connects clients with restaurants, convenience stores, bakeries and cafes that have a surplus of food, allowing clients to buy the surplus at a reduced price. The service launched in 2019 in Warsaw and has expanded to other major cities in Poland. It aims at reducing food waste by giving retailers the possibility to sell surpluses at limited price.

History 

The company was created in 2019 in Poland by Mateusz Kowalczyk and Jakub Fryszczyn. They noticed the problem of food waste working in a restaurant during studies in Great Britain. They founded the app by themselves initially raising as much as 100 000 PLN. The app was initially created for Android only, and later on also for IOS.

In 2022 startup raised 6 million PLN in seed round from VC like CofounderZone and Satus Starter as well as private investors such as founders of Pyszne.pl.

The startup claims to reach more than 3 000 businesses with more than 800 thousand users

Purpose 

The purpose of Foodsi is to limit food waste. Foodsi provides proxy to businesses who want to get rid of surplus products but are unable to sell at a normal price. Foodsi connects customers that can buy leftover packages at as much as 30% of a normal price. The company says that on average 4 out of 5 packages are sold.

In 2019 Foodsi employed more than 30 people and has plans of expansions. For now Foodsi functions in bigger polish cities such as Warsaw, Kraków, Trójmiasto, Wrocław, Poznań etc. Foodsi is planning expansion to other countries

Usage 
Businesses have to sing up for Foodsi via app or web. They do not have to pay any fee for signing app. They they post available packages based on predicted leftover quantities with price on the app for users to pick up. Businesses can post their packages at anytime during the day. Customers can pick up packages from bakeries, grocery stores, restaurants, but also florists and cosmetics shops. From each package Foodsi takes small provision.

Customers must download the app on the mobile phone (either Android or IOS) and register their account. Foodsi app displays the list of restaurants and other entities available in a certain region set by user's location. Customers have the visibility of price, address, distance and time- range for package pick-up. The packages are usually a 'surprise -packages' meaning that the customers do not know what food/product will be inside. At some restaurants the customer can choose the size of the package. The prices are up to 70% cheaper then the original products prices. The customer have to show up at a restaurant for package pick-up with their phone during the timespan specified in the app.

References

External links 

 Official website

Food waste
Mobile applications
Web applications
2019 establishments in Poland